Rafael Octavio Quirico Dottin (born September 7, 1969 in Santo Domingo, Dominican Republic) is a former Major League Baseball pitcher. He was called up from the minor leagues to make a start in the first game of a doubleheader against the Cincinnati Reds on June 25, but lasted just 1 innings, giving up seven runs on four hits, walking five batters while striking out just one. He was returned to the minor leagues, where he pitched one more season before his career ended.

External links

1969 births
Albany-Colonie Yankees players
Clearwater Phillies players
Columbus Clippers players
Dominican Republic expatriate baseball players in the United States
Greensboro Hornets players
Gulf Coast Yankees players
Lake Elsinore Storm players

Living people
Major League Baseball pitchers
Major League Baseball players from the Dominican Republic
Midland Angels players
Norwich Navigators players
Oneonta Yankees players
Philadelphia Phillies players
Prince William Cannons players
Reading Phillies players
Scranton/Wilkes-Barre Red Barons players